Harriet Pritchard Arnold ( Harriet Eudora Pritchard; pen name: H.E.P.; December 24, 1858 - August 4, 1901) was a 19th-century American author. 

Born in Connecticut, in 1858, she removed with her parents to Maine at a young age, with the greater portion of her life spent in Portland and vicinity. Her poems and short sketches appeared frequently in New England publications. Arnold died in 1901.

Biography
Harriet Eudora Pritchard, an only child, was born in Killingly, Connecticut, December 24, 1858. Her father was the Rev. Benjamin F. Pritchard, a New England clergyman of Scotch and English descent, and her mother was Celia (Handel) Pritchard. In her childhood, Arnold evinced no particular fondness for books, preferring outdoor recreations. While wandering among the wooded vales and hills near her home in a suburb of Portland, Maine, where the greater part of her life was passed, she perhaps unconsciously developed the latent poetry in her nature.

In 1882, when a lingering illness afforded her many hours of leisure, she began writing. Thereafter, her poems and sketches appeared in various magazines and periodicals under the signature H. E. P., and her maiden name, Harriet E. Pritchard.

In the year 1886, she married Ernest Warner Arnold, of Providence, Rhode Island, and made that city her home. She two children: Ralph and Celia.

Harriet Pritchard Arnold died August 4, 1901, aged 42, and was buried at Swan Point Cemetery in Providence.

References

Attribution

External links
 
 
 Harriet E. Pritchard at Pearls from Many Seas. A Galaxy of Thought from Four Hundred Writers

1858 births
1901 deaths
19th-century American writers
19th-century American women writers
Burials at Swan Point Cemetery
People from Killingly, Connecticut
Writers from Connecticut
Writers from Portland, Maine
Writers from Providence, Rhode Island
Wikipedia articles incorporating text from A Woman of the Century